Kimelman is a surname. Notable people with the surname include:

Donald Kimelman, American journalist
Edwin Kimelman (d. 2007), Canadian judge
Henry L. Kimelman (1921–2009), American businessman, political adviser and diplomat
Michael A. Kimelman - American entrepreneur, former trader, author, business coach, financial consultant and motivational speaker
Paul Kimelman (born 1947), American motivational speaker